The FM H-12-46 was a light road switcher of Fairbanks-Morse design manufactured exclusively by the Canadian Locomotive Company from October, 1951–January, 1953 for the Canadian National Railway. Only thirty of the 1,200 hp, six-cylinder opposed piston engine locomotives were produced. The units (assigned #7600–#7629) were configured in an A1A-A1A wheel arrangement, mounted atop a pair of three-axle trucks.  

Externally, they boasted many of the same Raymond Loewy design influences found on the larger and more powerful FM H-16-66 model, some of which were built during the same period. None of the units are known to exist today.

References

External links
 Fairbanks-Morse H12-44, H12-44TS & H12-46 Roster

A1A-A1A locomotives
H-12-46
CLC locomotives
Railway locomotives introduced in 1951
Standard gauge locomotives of Canada